Saint Irenarch or Irenarchus the Recluse of Rostov is honoured in the Russian Orthodox Church.

Irenarchus, Hermit of Rostov, was born into a peasant family in the village of Kondakovo in the Rostov district of Russia. In Baptism he received the name Elias. In his thirtieth year, he was tonsured a monk at the Rostov St.s Boris and Gleb Monastery. There he began fervently to labor at monastic tasks, he attended church services, and by night he prayed and slept on the ground. Once, taking pity on a vagrant who did not have shoes, St Irenarchus gave him his own boots, and from that time he began to go barefoot through the snow.

Irenarchus was a mystic and visionary.  After his death many physical, psychological, and spiritual healings were attributed to the touching of his relics.  He is commemorated 13 January in the Eastern Orthodox Church.

Irenarchus was a companion of John the Hairy.

References

 http://www.oca.org/FSlives.asp

Christian saints in unknown century
Ascetics
Russian saints of the Eastern Orthodox Church
Year of birth unknown

pl:Irenarch